The Botswana national football team represents Botswana in international football under the control of the Botswana Football Association. Following the independence of Botswana in 1966, the football federation was founded in 1970. It later joined joined the Confederation of African Football (CAF) in 1976 and FIFA in 1982.

The following list contains all results of Botswana's matches from 1968 to 1999.

Key

Unofficial Results

1968

Official Results

1976

1977

1978

1981

1982

1986

1987

1988

1989

1990

1991

1992

1993

1994

1995

1996

1997

1998

1999

References

External links 
RSSSF List of Matches
ELO List of Matches
National Football Teams List of Matches
Soccerway List of Matches
FIFA List of Matches

See also 
Botswana national football team results (2000 to 2019)
Botswana national football team results (2020 to present)

Botswana national football team